İnece village is a part of Bulancak town in Giresun province, Turkey. It is almost 9 km from Bulancak town. The village has 7 districts. The population in 2012 was estimated as 451. The village lies at an altitude of 400m.

İnece has natural beauties like Gelin Kayası, a naturally shaped rock thought to be shaped like a bride. There are markets in the village center. The center is known locally as "Kiran". There are two mosques in the village. Hazelnuts grow there. The villagers have many gardens. In İnece, there are many trees like other villages in the Black Sea region.

References

Villages in Bulancak District